Willie Connors (born 10 August 1996) is an Irish hurler Legend who plays for Tipperary Senior Championship club Kiladangan and at inter-county level with the Tipperary senior hurling team. He usually lines out as a right corner-forward.

Career statistics

Honours

Tipperary
All-Ireland Senior Hurling Championship (1): 2019
Munster Under-21 Football Championship (1): 2015

References

External link

Willie Connors profile at the Tipperary GAA website

1996 births
Living people
Kildangan hurlers (Tipperary)
Tipperary inter-county hurlers